The 1990 FIFA World Cup qualification UEFA Group 5 was a UEFA qualifying group for the 1990 FIFA World Cup. The group comprised Cyprus, France, Norway, Scotland and Yugoslavia.

The group was won by Yugoslavia, who qualified for the 1990 FIFA World Cup. Scotland also qualified as runners-up.

Standings

Results

Note 1: This match was played on neutral ground in Greece instead of in Cyprus because Cyprus was penalised for rioting during the Cyprus vs Scotland match.

Goalscorers
There were 54 goals scored during the 20 games, an average of 2.7 goals per game.

6 goals

 Mo Johnston

3 goals

 Gøran Sørloth
 Dejan Savićević

2 goals

 Christos Kolliandris
 Pambos Pittas
 Didier Deschamps
 Jean-Pierre Papin
 Rune Bratseth
 Jan Åge Fjørtoft
 Kjetil Osvold
 Ally McCoist
 Richard Gough
 Faruk Hadžibegić
 Srečko Katanec
 Dragan Stojković
 Zlatko Vujović

1 goal

 Yiannos Ioannou
 Floros Nicolaou
 Laurent Blanc
 Eric Cantona
 Jean-Philippe Durand
 Christian Perez
 Franck Sauzée
 Daniel Xuereb
 Erland Johnsen
 Gordon Durie
 Paul McStay
 Darko Pančev
 Predrag Spasić
 Vujadin Stanojković
 Safet Sušić

1 own goal

 Gary Gillespie (playing against Yugoslavia)

5
1988–89 in Scottish football
1989–90 in Scottish football
1988–89 in Yugoslav football
qual
1988–89 in French football
Qual
1988–89 in Cypriot football
1989–90 in Cypriot football
1989 in Norwegian football
1990 in Norwegian football
Qualifying group